Draba obovata is a species of plant in the family Brassicaceae.  It is endemic to Ecuador. Its natural habitats are subtropical or tropical high-altitude grassland and rocky areas. It is an IUCN Red List Near threatened species, threatened by habitat loss.

References

obovata
Endemic flora of Ecuador
Near threatened flora of South America
Taxonomy articles created by Polbot